Richard Walter Hubbell (November 8, 1840April 5, 1910) was an American lawyer, politician, and judge.  He was a member of the Wisconsin State Assembly, representing Oconto County during the 1872 and 1873 sessions, and also served as county judge and district attorney.  In the American Civil War, he served as a Union Army artillery officer.  He was a son of Levi Hubbell—the first Wisconsin state official to be impeached.

Early life and education

Born in Ithaca, New York, Hubbell moved with his parents to Wisconsin Territory in 1844 and settled in Milwaukee.  Hubbell's father was a prominent lawyer and judge in these days, and afforded a good education for his sons.  Hubbell attended a college preparatory course in 1853, and then attended the University of Wisconsin from 1854 through 1858, graduating with a bachelor's degree.  Hubbell flourished at the University and was one of the charter members there of the Hesperia literary society, along with his lifelong friend William Freeman Vilas.  Hubbell subsequently earned his master's degree in 1861, and was admitted to the bar in 1862.

Civil War service
In the second year of the war, as new calls were being made for volunteers to the Union Army, Hubbell saw several of his University classmates joining the service.  William F. Vilas recruited a company for the 23rd Wisconsin Infantry Regiment, which Hubbell sought to join, but was too late to register a spot.  He instead joined a company for the 24th Wisconsin Infantry Regiment, and was enrolled as a sergeant in Company I of that regiment.  

He served only a few months with the 24th Wisconsin Infantry, but saw serious combat with them at the Battle of Perryville.  In the Winter of 1862–1863, he accepted a commission to become a first lieutenant in the 1st Wisconsin Heavy Artillery Regiment.  With the 1st Wisconsin Heavy Artillery, he served with Battery B, which was stationed for the rest of the war at forts in Kentucky and Tennessee.  He was promoted to captain of his battery in July 1864, and was then made a major in the regiment in September 1864.  He mustered out with the rest of the regiment in June 1865.

Legal and political career
After the war, Hubbell moved to Oconto, Wisconsin, and established a legal practice. Hubbell became active with the Republican Party of Wisconsin and first ran for Wisconsin State Assembly in 1867.  He failed in that campaign, but was subsequently elected to two consecutive terms, serving in the 1872 and 1873 sessions.  In the meantime, he was also elected to two four-year terms as county judge for Oconto County, serving in that office from 1870 through 1878.  In the 1877 election, rather than running again for judge, he ran for and was elected district attorney, for a two year term.

In 1890, Hubbell moved to Wautoma, Wisconsin, without his family and continued to practice law.  He died at his home in Wautoma in 1910, he had been in ill health.

Personal life and family
Richard Hubbell was one of at least four children of Levi Hubbell, a Wisconsin pioneer lawyer and judge who served in Wisconsin's first state supreme court and was the first state official to be impeached by the Wisconsin Legislature.  He was not convicted in his impeachment trial, and later served as United States Attorney for Wisconsin.

Richard's grandfather, Abijah Hubbell, served in the American Revolutionary War.  The Hubbells were descendants of Richard Hubbell, an English immigrant who came to the Connecticut Colony about 1650.

Richard W. Hubbell married Emily Snover in 1871.  They had at least six children, but at least one died in infancy.

In addition to his legal career, Hubbell was a lifelong literary enthusiast and wrote his own poetry and prose.  For much of his life, including his final years, Hubbell wrote for and edited the Wisconsin Alumni Magazine in its various incarnations.  Near the end of his life, he published several of his poems in the magazine.

He was also apparently a fishing enthusiast, and authored a pamphlet on fly fishing, titled Hints on Fly Fishing.

Electoral history

Wisconsin Assembly (1871, 1872)

| colspan="6" style="text-align:center;background-color: #e9e9e9;"| General Election, November 7, 1871

| colspan="6" style="text-align:center;background-color: #e9e9e9;"| General Election, November 5, 1872

References

External links

1840 births
1910 deaths
Politicians from Ithaca, New York
Politicians from Milwaukee
People from Oconto, Wisconsin
People from Wautoma, Wisconsin
People of Wisconsin in the American Civil War
University of Wisconsin–Madison alumni
Wisconsin lawyers
Wisconsin state court judges
County officials in Wisconsin
Members of the Wisconsin State Assembly
Writers from Ithaca, New York
Writers from Wisconsin
Burials in Wisconsin
Union Army officers
19th-century American judges
19th-century American lawyers